Ameir Ali Ameir (born 23 September 1961) is a Member of Parliament in the National Assembly of Tanzania.

Ameir was first elected to the Tanzanian National Assembly in 2005, after five years as internal auditor for the Ministry of State.

References

Living people
Members of the National Assembly (Tanzania)
1961 births